Asperspina is a genus of sea slugs, marine gastropod mollusks within the clade Acochlidiacea.

Taxonomy 
Asperspinidae has been listed as a synonym of Parhedylidae in the taxonomy of Bouchet & Rocroi (2005).

Sensu Schrödl & Neusser (2010) is Asperspina is the only genus in the family Asperspinidae. Minicheviellidae is a junior synonym of Asperspinidae.

Species
Species within the genus Asperspina include:
 Asperspina brambelli (Swedmark, 1968)
 Asperspina murmanica (Kudinskaya & Minichev, 1978) - synonym: Minicheviella murmanica (Kuchinskaja & Minichev, 1978)
 Asperspina rhopalotecta Salvini-Plawen, 1973
 Asperspina loricata (Swedmark, 1968)
 Asperspina riseri (Morse, 1976)

References

Further reading 
 "Heartless and primitive? 3D reconstruction of the polar acochlidian gastropod Asperspina murmanica". 
 Hochberg R. (2007). "Serotonin-like Immunoreactivity in the Central and Peripheral Nervous Systems of the Interstitial Acochlidean Asperspina sp. (Opisthobranchia)". Biological Bulletin 213: 43-54. HTM.

Asperspinidae